This page contains a table listing by elevation all 514 mountains of the Alps that are between 2500 and 3000m m high and which also have a topographic prominence of at least . The list is a continuation of the List of prominent mountains of the Alps above 3000 m, which contains an introduction with statistics and an explanation of the criteria. The list is continued down to 2000 m elevation on this page.

Alpine mountains between 2500 and 3000 m

The table is continued here.

See also 

List of mountains of the Alps above 3000 m
List of Alpine peaks by prominence
List of Alpine four-thousanders 
List of the highest mountains in Austria
List of the highest mountains in Germany 
List of mountains in Slovenia 
List of mountains of Switzerland

Notes

References

Sources
Jonathan de Ferranti & Eberhard Jurgalski's map-checked ALPS TO R589m and rough, computer-generated EUROPE TO R150m lists 
Christian Thöni's list of 8875 summits in Switzerland
Clem Clements'  Austria above 2500 m lists
Mark Trengrove and Clem Clements'  list of German alps above 2000 m
Mark Trengrove's lists of several regions of the French Alps, and of the Grand paradiso and Rutor ranges of the  Italian Alps

2500 m
Alps